Elisabeth Murdoch College (EMC)  (formerly Langwarrin Post Primary School (1984-1986), Langwarrin Secondary College (1987-2004)) is a government-run state high school located in Melbourne's south-eastern suburb of Langwarrin. The college offers a broad range of curriculum areas for students in the secondary years of education. The college has an education program which incorporates VCE, VCAL and VET. The college is an RTO which can grant certificate courses.

Improvements to the college have taken place over the last five years, including a gym, a performing arts center, and an auditorium.

External links
  Elisabeth Murdoch College Victoria
 Victorian Government Schools Online

Secondary schools in Melbourne
Educational institutions established in 1984
1984 establishments in Australia
Buildings and structures in the City of Frankston